Kirpal Parmar is an Indian politician. He was a Member of Parliament, representing Himachal Pradesh in the Rajya Sabha the upper house of India's Parliament

References

Rajya Sabha members from Himachal Pradesh
Bharatiya Janata Party politicians from Himachal Pradesh
1959 births
Living people